Colin Hedderick Shaw (c. 1902 – 28 August 1976) was a rugby union player who represented Australia.

Shaw, a lock, was born in Edinburgh and claimed a total of 3 international rugby caps for Australia.

References

Australian rugby union players
Australia international rugby union players
1976 deaths
1900s births
Scottish emigrants to Australia
Rugby union players from Edinburgh
Rugby union locks